The Reșița Steam Locomotive Museum is an open-air railway museum located in the Triaj Park district of Reșița, Caraș-Severin County, Romania.  Entry is free and there is no restriction on examining the exhibits.  It claims it is the largest open-air railway museum in Europe.

The museum was founded by Engineer Mircea Popa, then director of the locomotive manufacturing plant located in Reșița.  Its inauguration was meant to coincide with the centennial anniversary of locomotive manufacturing history in the city.  The locomotive factory produced 1,491 steam locomotives with the last one being produced in 1964, after which production shifted to diesel and electric locomotives.

Reșița became an extremely important pillar of the railway industry in Hungary and Romania around 1867 after private companies, like the iron factories and steel works of Rimamurány-Salgótarjáni Vasmű Rt. (Rimamurány-Salgótarján Ironwork Co. - RMST), and Állami Vaspályatársaság (State Railway Company - ÁVT - Staats Eisenbahngesellschaft – StEg in German) started production in Reșița.

There are a total of 16 locomotives on display, 14 of which were produced by local factory and span over 100 years in steam locomotive history. The other two locomotives, the Bogsan and Hungaria, were acquired in 1937.

The museum and its collection was added to as a National Monument (Monument Istoric) in 2004 with an LMI code of CS-II-a-A-10905.

In 2013, the Resicza lost out to the Danube Gorge to become the regional symbol of the Romanian Banat for European Cooperation Day, which is yearly on September 21.

Collection

The open-air museum hosts 16 locomotives, with 14 constructed locally:

 Resicza
 230.516 - Royal Train King Ferdinand
 704.402 – Princess Elena (the 704.401 - Prince Carol is held elsewhere)
 CFF 704.209
 CFF 704.404
 CFR 764.001
 CFR 764.493
 CFU 14
 CFU 29
 CFR 50.025
 CFR 50.378
 CFR 142.072
 CFR 150.038
 CFR 131.003 (Prairie Series)
 CFR 230.128
 CFR 475.028 (MAV 475)

The Resicza 

The main attraction is the locomotive Resicza No. 2, the first steam locomotive build in Southeast Europe, in 1872.  It was constructed based on Scottish engineer John Haswell's Model No. 1, which was built in Vienna and named Szecul.  Haswell's model was manufactured in Vienna by the Locomotive Factory of the Vienna (Győr Railway Company) in 1871.  The Szekul model was placed into operation on the 950 mm gauge industrial network of the Reșița Iron Factory where three steam engines identical to this model were built, the first being the Resicza.

The locomotive Resicza  was designed for a 948 mm gauge track and was utilized between 1872 and 1937.  It was recuperated and saved in 1961 by head engineer Mircea Popa from the Campia Turzii yard where it was planned for scrapping.

Gallery

References 

Tourist attractions in Caraș-Severin County
Historic monuments in Caraș-Severin County
Open-air museums in Romania
Transport museums in Romania
Railway museums in Romania
Reșița